Maplesville High School is a secondary school located in Maplesville, Alabama. They educate grades K-12.

As of 2018, the school principal is John Howard. The school colors are red and white and their team name is the Maplesville Red Devils.

Athletics
In 1995, the school's girls' basketball team won the 1A State Championship.
In 1996 and 2014, 2015, and 2016 the school's football team won the 1A State Championship.
In 1996 and 1997, the school's baseball team won back-to-back 1A State Championships. Their football team hasn’t won a championship since 2017.

Notable alumni
 Harold Morrow, fullback for the Minnesota Vikings 
 Tommie Agee, NFL player for the Dallas Cowboys

References

 History of Chilton County, Boone Newspapers. October 28, 2005. Retrieved October 28, 2005.

External links
 Maplesville High School official website

Schools in Chilton County, Alabama
Public K-12 schools in Alabama